Empire of Fear: Inside the Islamic State is a book by Andrew Hosken, a BBC reporter specialized on the Islamic State. Said book deals with the Islamic State, the conditions which led to its creation, its funding and its future plans for expansion.

References

2015 non-fiction books
Works about the Islamic State of Iraq and the Levant